Nicholas Campion (born 4 March 1953) is a British astrologer and historian of astrology and cultural astronomy. He is the author of a number of books and currently pursues an academic career.

Career

Astrology 
Campion is a former Daily Mail astrologer, where he took over from John Naylor, the son of R. H. Naylor, the first sun sign astrologer. He was president of the Astrological Lodge of London from 1985–7 and of the Astrological Association of Great Britain from 1994–99. He published a number of books on the practice of astrology between 1987 (The Practical Astrologer) and 2004 (The Book of World Horoscopes).

History of astrology and cultural astronomy 
Concurrently with his activities as an astrologer Campion researched and published on the history of astrology and cultural astronomy. His book on millenarianism, The Great Year (1994), was described by Daily Telegraph journalist Damian Thompson as "a monumental study of historical schemes".
In 1997 he founded the peer-reviewed journal Culture and Cosmos.

Academica 
Campion is Associate Professor in Cosmology and Culture, Director the Sophia Centre, Principal Lecturer in the Institute of Education and Humanities, and programme director of the MA programmes in Cultural Astronomy and Astrology, and Ecology and Spirituality, at the University of Wales Trinity Saint David.
In 2019 he became the Director of the University’s Harmony Institute and edited The Harmony Debates, a collection of forty-two papers on the philosophy and practice of Harmony.

Books 
Campion is the author/co-author of many books on astrology and its history, including:

 
 
 
 
 
 
 
 
 

 
 
 
 
 
 
 Campion, Nicholas (2015). The Moral Philosophy of Space Travel: A Historical Review, in Jai Galliot (ed.), Commercial Space Exploration: Ethics, Policy, Governance (Abingdon: Ashgate; London: Routledge 2016), pp. 9–22. .
 Campion, Nicholas (2015). The New Age in the Modern West: Counter-Culture, Utopia and Prophecy from the late Eighteenth Century to the Present Day. London: Bloomsbury 2015. .
 Campion, Nicholas; Pimenta, F.; Ribeiro, N.; Silva, F.; Joaquinito, A.; Tirapicos, L. (2015). Stars and Stones: Voyages in Archaeoastronomy and Cultural Astronomy – a Meeting of Different Worlds. Oxford: British Archaeology Reports. .
 Campion, Nicholas; Silva, Fabio (2015). Skyscapes: The Role and Importance of the Sky in Archaeology. Oxford: Oxbow. .
 Campion, Nicholas; Greenbaum, Dorian (2016). Astrology in Time and Place: Cross-Cultural Currents in the History of Astrology. Newcastle: Cambridge Scholars Publishing. .
 Campion, Nicholas; Rappenglück, Barbara; Rappenglück, Michael; Silva, Fabio (2016). Astronomy and Power: How Worlds are Structured. Oxford: British Archaeology Reports. .
 Campion, Nicholas (2016). Archaeoastronomy and Calendar Cities in Daniel Brown (ed.), Modern Archaeoastronomy: From Material Culture to Cosmology, Journal of Physics: Conference Series, Vol. 865, 2016, pp. 1–7.
 Campion, Nicholas (2016). Heavenly Discourses. Proceedings of the Heavenly Discourses Conference, University of Bristol, 14–16 October 2011. Lampeter: Sophia Centre Press. .
 Campion, Nicholas (2017). The Importance of Cosmology in Culture: Contexts and Consequences, in Abraao Jesse Capistrano de Souza (ed.),  Cosmology, InTech Open, pp. 3–17. .

 Campion, Nicholas; Zahrt, Jennifer (2018). Astrology as Art: Representation and Practice. Lampeter: Sophia Centre Press. .
 Campion, Nicholas; Impey, Chris (2018). Imagining Other Worlds: Explorations in Astronomy and Culture. Lampeter: Sophia Centre Press. .
 Campion, Nicholas (2020). The Harmony Debates: Exploring a Practical Philosophy for a Sustainable Future. Lampeter: Sophia Centre Press. .

Awards 
Marc Edmund Jones Award (1992)
Prix Georges Antares Award (1994)
Spica Award (1999)
Charles Harvey Prize (2002)
Regulus Award (2002)
Regulus Award (2012)

References

External links 
 
 Staff page at the University of Wales Trinity Saint David

1953 births
Living people
Academics of the University of Wales, Lampeter
Writers from Bristol
Alumni of Queens' College, Cambridge
English astrological writers
20th-century astrologers
21st-century astrologers